McNicholas is a surname. Notable people with the surname include:

Conor McNicholas, British journalist and magazine editor
Derek McNicholas (born 1985), Irish hurler
John T. McNicholas (1877–1950), Irish-born, American Roman Catholic bishop
Joseph Alphonse McNicholas (1923–1983), American Roman Catholic bishop
Lily McNicholas (1909 – 1998), Irish nurse in the Second World War
Maura McNicholas, Irish camogie player
Patrick McNicholas (1919–1990), Irish-born Canadian politician
Paul McNicholas (rugby league) (born 1975), Australian rugby league player
Steve McNicholas (born 1955), English actor and director

See also
Archbishop McNicholas High School, a high school in Ohio, United States

Anglicised Irish-language surnames
Patronymic surnames
Surnames from given names